Kalindi River is a tidal estuarine river in and around the Sundarbans in North 24 Parganas district in the Indian state of West Bengal, bordering on Satkhira District of  Bangladesh.

The Ichamati breaks up into several distributaries below Hingalganj the chief of which are the Raimangal, Bidya, Jhilla, Kalindi and Jamuna. These fan out into wide estuaries in the Sundarbans.

References

External links

Rivers of West Bengal
Rivers of Bangladesh
North 24 Parganas district
Sundarbans
International rivers of Asia
Rivers of India
Rivers of Khulna Division